Anthrax albofasciatus is a species of fly in the family Bombyliidae.

Distribution
United States, Mexico, Guatemala, Honduras.

References

Bombyliidae
Insects described in 1840
Diptera of North America
Taxa named by Pierre-Justin-Marie Macquart